The Mimico Monarchs were a Junior ice hockey team based in the Mimico neighbourhood of Toronto, Ontario, Canada. For some time, the team was known as the Richmond Hill Riot and played in Richmond Hill, Ontario.

History
The Monarchs were a part of the Central Junior B Hockey League. In 1989, they jumped to the Metro Junior "B" league and stayed with the league until one season after it became the Metro Junior A Hockey League.  The Monarchs existed from 1983 until 1992.  They moved to Richmond Hill to become the Richmond Hill Riot in 1992.  The Riot folded in 1995.

Season-by-season results

Playoffs
1990 Lost Preliminary
Vaughan Raiders defeated Mimico Monarchs 3-games-to-1
1991 Lost Preliminary
Richmond Hill Rams defeated Mimico Monarchs 2-games-to-1
1992 DNQ
1993 Lost Quarter-final
Richmond Hill Riot defeated Kingston Voyageurs 3-games-to-none
Wexford Raiders defeated Richmond Hill Riot 4-games-to-none
1994 DNQ
1995 DNQ

External links
OHA Website

Defunct ice hockey teams in Canada
Ice hockey teams in Ontario
Ice hockey teams in Toronto
1983 establishments in Ontario
1995 disestablishments in Ontario
Ice hockey clubs established in 1983
Ice hockey clubs disestablished in 1995